Geier may refer to:

 Geier (surname), a surname of German origin (includes a list) 
 The Geier Indians, 17th century Native American group

Places
Mount Geier, Antarctica
Geier (Tux Alps), Austria

Fiction
Der Geier (in English The Vulture (Kafka)), a short story by Franz Kafka
List of Bones characters#Marcus Geier, a character in the television show Bones

Naval
Geier (freighter), 1916–1917, a British freighter captured by German navy
, a German cruiser
Geier (patrol boat), a German patrol boat
The FRG Geier, a ship decommissioned in 1976, sold to Greece, and renamed Tyfon
Geier, the nickname for an experimental German World War II torpedo

See also
Gayer (surname)
Geyer (disambiguation)
Geijer

es:Buitre (desambiguación)
fr:Vautour (homonymie)